Michael Jerome Gibson (born October 27, 1960) is a retired professional basketball power forward who played two seasons in the National Basketball Association (NBA) as a member of the Washington Bullets (1983–84) and the Detroit Pistons (1985–86). Born in Williamsburg County, South Carolina, he was drafted out of University of South Carolina Upstate by the Bullets during the second round of the 1982 NBA draft. Until the addition of Torrey Craig for the Denver Nuggets in 2017 via two-way contract, he was the only player in Upstate's history to ever play in the NBA. In 1993 he won with Hapoel Galil-Elion a historical championship in Israel; it was the first time after 23 years that another team other than Maccabi Tel Aviv won.

External links

Living people
1960 births
American expatriate basketball people in Israel
American expatriate basketball people in Italy
American expatriate basketball people in Spain
American men's basketball players
Auxilium Pallacanestro Torino players
Basketball players from South Carolina
Detroit Pistons players
Detroit Spirits players
Hapoel Galil Elyon players
Hapoel Tel Aviv B.C. players
Jacksonville Jets (CBA) players
Liga ACB players
Maine Lumberjacks players
Mississippi Jets players
People from Williamsburg County, South Carolina
Power forwards (basketball)
Quad City Thunder players
Rochester Zeniths players
USC Upstate Spartans men's basketball players
Washington Bullets draft picks
Washington Bullets players
American expatriate basketball people in the Philippines
Crispa Redmanizers players
Philippine Basketball Association imports